James S. Ettema is an American academic. He is Professor Emeritus of Communication Studies at Northwestern University, and the author of several books.

Career
Before starting his doctorate, Ettema worked as a photographer and filmmaker. He is a co-founder of Northwestern University's Media, Technology and Society graduate program, served for six years as chair of Communication Studies and for ten years as the faculty coordinator of professional graduate programs in the department.

Selected works

References

Living people
University of Minnesota School of Journalism and Mass Communication alumni
University of Michigan alumni
Northwestern University faculty
Year of birth missing (living people)